Mohammad Ferdous Khan (died March 30, 2016) was a Bangladeshi educationist. He was awarded the Ekushey Padak in 1980 and the Independence Day Award by the Government of Bangladesh. He was the eldest son of Amanat Khan, a former member of Bengal Legislative Assembly.

Career
Khan served as the Director of Public Instruction (DPI) from October 1965 until March 1972.

References

2016 deaths
Bangladeshi educators
Recipients of the Ekushey Padak
Recipients of the Independence Day Award